Microbulbifer hydrolyticus is a gram-negative, rod-shaped, strictly aerobic bacteria, the type species of its genus. It was first isolated from lignin-rich pulp mill effluent. Its type strain is IRE-31 (= ATCC 700072).

References

Further reading
Mason, Olivia Underwood. Prokaryotes associated with marine crust. ProQuest, 2008.
Dworkin, Martin, and Stanley Falkow, eds. The Prokaryotes: Vol. 6: Proteobacteria: Gamma Subclass. Vol. 6. Springer, 2006.

External links

LPSN
Type strain of Microbulbifer hydrolyticus at BacDive -  the Bacterial Diversity Metadatabase

Alteromonadales
Bacteria described in 1997